The Special Airborne Force (SABF) also known as Special Airborne Wing is the first elite special force in Sri Lanka Air Force and forms part of the SLAF Regiment. It provides air assault capabilities and VVIP protection. Formed out of the Administrative Regiment Branch in 1989 by Air Vice Marshal Oliver Ranasinghe, it initially under took counter insurgency operations during the 1987–1989 JVP insurrection. In the Sri Lankan Civil War it provided VIP protection under the Chief Provost Marshal, until it was transferred to the Directorate of Ground Operations.

Role 
The Special Air Borne Force performs the following roles:

 V.V.I.P and V.I.P Protection operations
 Counter Assault operations
 Counter terrorism operations
 Counter insurgency operations
 Counter penetration operations
 Military operations in urban terrain
 Special missions in rescue operations 
 Special covert operations 
 Sky marshal operations in domestic and international commercial flights

Training 
SABF personnel are specialised in VIP Protection, bomb disposal, firefighting, water survival, anti-hijack and rescue operations. Advanced training is carried out at the Sri Lanka Army Special Force training school at Maduruoya and SLAF Katunayake.

References

Sri Lanka Air Force
Paratroopers
Military parachuting
Airborne units and formations of Sri Lanka
Air force ground defence units and formations
Military units and formations established in 1990
Sri Lanka Air Force Wings
Special forces of Sri Lanka